Orlando Echeverri Benedetti (born 26 October 1980 in Cartagena) is a Colombian writer based in the United Kingdom. He has previously worked for the newspaper El Universal. El Malpensante and Universo Centro have also both published some his short stories and articles. In 2014 he was awarded the Bogotá Institute of Arts Book Award with his novel "Sin freno por la senda equivocada", which was later published by El Peregrino Ediciones. His second novel, "Criacuervo", was published the following year by Angosta Editores and selected as one of the best Colombian books in 2017 by SOHO magazine. Criacuervo was also one of the final novels selected for the National Book Prize of the Colombian Ministry of Culture in 2018. In 2018, Random House published his third book, "La fiesta en el cañaveral" a collection of short stories. 

In 2019, the Bogotá Institute of Arts invited him to join "Bogotá Contada", an initiative that invites Hispanic American writers to visit the Colombian capital to offer lectures and write about the city.

Books

Novels 

 Sin freno por la senda equivocada, El Peregrino Ediciones, Bogotá, 2015. 

 Criacuervo, Angosta Editores, Medellín, 2017.  / Edicola Ediciones (in Spanish), Santiago de Chile,  / Edicola Ediciones (translated into Italian by Marta Rota Núñez)

Short Stories Books 

 La fiesta en el cañaveral, Literatura Random House, 2018.

Anthologies 

 Puñalada trapera Antología colombiana de cuentos de Antonio García Ángel, Mónica Gil Restrepo, Luis Noriega, Pilar Quintana, Andrés Mauricio Muñoz, Carolina Cuervo, Gilmer Mesa, Patricia Engel, Andrés Felipe Solano, Mariana Jaramillo Fonseca, Orlando Echeverri Benedetti, Gloria Susana Esquivel, Daniel Ferreira, Margarita García Robayo, Juan Cárdenas, Daisy Hernández, Humberto Ballesteros, Juliana Restrepo, César Mackenzie, Daniel Villabón, Natalia Maya Ochoa y Matías Godoy. Rey Naranjo Editores. 2017.  (Translated into Italian as: Heridas. Ventidue racconti dalla Colombia / traduttore: M. C. Secci / Gran vía edizioni /)
 El Coi y otros cuentos Antología colombiana de cuentos de Carlos Mauricio Vega Pacheco,  Orlando Echeverri Benedetti, Carlos Gabriel Rodríguez, Julian Enrique Penagos, VinceDaniel Taborda Hernàndez, Róbinson Grajales, Jerónimo García Riaño, Juan Diego Zabala Duque , Jorge Andrés Hernández, John Harold Better Armalla, Rubén Darío Barreto Viana, Efrain Enrique Villanueva, Jorge Lewinnek, Farid Mendez Lozano, Eduardo Otálora, Andrés Leonardo Estupiñán, Boris Arturo Ramírez, Miguel Angel Afanador, Alejandro Arciniegas, Clinton Ramírez, Andrea Beaudoin Valenzuela, Rolando Blanco. VII Concurso de cuento La Cueva. Antología de cuentos de Fundación La Cueva. 2018.

Awards 

 Premio nacional de Novela Idartes, Colombia, 2014
 Premio nacional de Cuento Idartes, Colombia 2017

References 

1980 births
Living people
Colombian male short story writers
21st-century Colombian writers